Zärtliche Haie is a 1967 German-French comedy film directed by Michel Deville and starring Anna Karina.

Cast
 Anna Karina as Elena / Costa
 Mario Adorf as Spion SB 3
 Gérard Barray as Gregory
 Fritz Tillmann as Admiral
 Scilla Gabel as Zeezee
 Klaus Dahlen as Alexander
 Rainer von Artenfels as Philander
 Franco Giacobini as Fähnrich

References

External links

1967 films
1960s spy comedy films
1960s French-language films
West German films
French spy comedy films
German spy comedy films
Films directed by Michel Deville
Military humor in film
Seafaring films
Cross-dressing in film
1967 comedy films
1960s French films
1960s German films